In topology and related areas of mathematics, a topological space  is a nodec space if every nowhere dense subset of  is closed.

References
.

General topology